Pseudobissetia is a genus of moths of the family Crambidae.

Species

References

Natural History Museum Lepidoptera genus database

Haimbachiini
Crambidae genera
Taxa named by Stanisław Błeszyński